Mosammat Sirat Jahan Shopna (Bengali: মোসাম্মাত সিরাত জাহান স্বপ্না; born 10 April 2001) is a Bangladeshi women's footballer who plays as a forward for Bashundhara Kings Women and the Bangladesh women's national football team. She previously played for Palichara Government High School, Rangpur.

Shopna scored for Bangladesh in the 40th minute in the final of the 2016 SAFF Women's Championship.

Early years
Sirat Jahan Shopna was born on 10 April 2001 in Rangpur.

International goals
Scores and result list Bangladesh's goal tally first.

Honours

Club 
Bashundhara Kings Women

 Bangladesh Women's Football League
 Winners (3): 2019–20, 2020–21, 2021–22

International 
SAFF Women's Championship
Winner : 2022
Runner-up : 2016
South Asian Games
Bronze : 2016
SAFF U-18 Women's Championship
Champion (1): 2018
Bangamata U-19 Women's International Gold Cup
Champion trophy shared (1): 2019
AFC U-14 Girls' Regional C'ship – South and Central
Bangladesh U-14 Girls'
Champion : 2015

References

External links

2001 births
Living people
Bangladeshi women's footballers
Bangladesh women's international footballers
Bashundhara Kings players
Bangladesh Women's Football League players
Women's association football forwards
People from Rangpur District
Bangladeshi women's futsal players
South Asian Games bronze medalists for Bangladesh
South Asian Games medalists in football